Aswismarmo (Jogjakarta, Dutch East Indies, 27 November 1925 – Jakarta, Indonesia, 12 January 2011) was an Indonesian Military major general who served as the general secretary of the General Elections Institution from 1983 until 1987.

Early life
Aswismarmo was born on 27 November 1925 in Yogyakarta. He was the son of Djayengdimedjo.

He began his studies by learning at the RK HIS II, which he graduated in 1934, Gout HIK, which he graduated in 1942, and SMT Negeri Yogyakarta, which he graduated in 1945.

Military career
After pursuing civil education, he enrolled in the newly formed Indonesian Armed Forces. He became part of the intelligence service, serving in Okinawa in 1960, and in West Germany since 1961.

After serving in intelligence, he became a teacher in the Officer Advanced Course from 1967, and in the Indonesian Army Command and General Staff College from 1968.

Political career 
After retiring from the military, he was offered a position as the ambassador of Indonesia for Italy from 1976 until 1977, and for Vietnam from 1988 until 1992.

On 1983, he was appointed as the general secretary of the Ministry of Home Affairs at that time, Soepardjo Rustam. During his tenure, the 1987 Indonesian legislative election was held. As the general secretary of the Ministry of Home Affairs, he was also the general secretary of the General Elections Institution, which organizes the election.

Bibliography

References

1925 births
2011 deaths
Indonesian Muslims
Indonesian military personnel
People from Yogyakarta
Ambassadors of Indonesia to Italy
Ambassadors of Indonesia to Vietnam